The 2020 Henry 180 was a NASCAR Xfinity Series race held on August 8, 2020 at Road America in Elkhart Lake, Wisconsin. Contested over 45 laps on the  road course, it was the 18th race of the 2020 NASCAR Xfinity Series season. Austin Cindric won his fourth race of the season, which was his fourth victory in the last five races.

Report

Background 

Road America is a motorsport road course located near Elkhart Lake, Wisconsin on Wisconsin Highway 67. It has hosted races since the 1950s and currently hosts races in the NASCAR Xfinity Series, NTT Indycar Series, NTTWeatherTech SportsCar Championship, SCCA Pirelli World Challenge, ASRA, AMA Superbike series, IndyCar Series, and SCCA Pro Racing's Trans-Am Series.

This was the first Xfinity Series race to allow fans to attend since March due to the COVID-19 pandemic.

Modified Pit Procedures 
Due to the race being held at a separate venue from the Cup Series and the subsequent need to use alternate pit crew members, NASCAR implemented alternate pit procedures for the Henry 180. The field was frozen at the time of the caution, and each team could change only fuel or tires during each stop (multiple changes would require multiple pit stops during the same pit cycle). Additionally, there was a time limit set for pit road: A minimum of 60 seconds for green flag stops and a maximum of 80 seconds for stops under caution. Tire changes were not allowed under green flag stops unless NASCAR specifically permitted it.

Entry list 

 (R) denotes rookie driver.
 (i) denotes driver who is ineligible for series driver points.

Qualifying 
Michael Annett was awarded the pole for the race as determined by a random draw; his third straight race drawing the pole position.

Starting Lineup 

 The No. 5 of Vinnie Miller had to start from the rear due to a driver change (Miller replaced Matt Mills).
 The No. 93 of Myatt Snider had to start from the rear due to unapproved adjustments.

Race

Race results

Stage Results 
Stage One

Laps: 14

Stage Two

Laps: 15

Final Stage Results 
Laps: 16

Race statistics 

 Lead changes: 13 among 9 different drivers
 Cautions/Laps: 7 for 15
 Red flags: 1
 Time of race: 2 hours, 56 minutes, 37 seconds
 Average speed:

Media

Television 
The Henry 180 was carried by NBCSN in the United States. Dave Burns, Jeff Burton, and Dale Jarrett called the race from NBC Sports's studios in Charlotte, NC, with Parker Kligerman covering pit road.

Radio 
The Motor Racing Network (MRN) called the race for radio, which was simulcast on SiriusXM NASCAR Radio. Mike Bagley and Kurt Becker called the action from the booth. Woody Cain, Steve Post, Dan Hubbard, Jim Tretow, Eric Morse, Tim Catalfamo, Jason Toy, and Chris Wilner called the action from the turns. Pete Pistone and Hannah Newhouse provided reports from pit road.

Standings after the race 

 Drivers' Championship standings

 Note: Only the first 12 positions are included for the driver standings.
 . – Driver has clinched a position in the NASCAR playoffs.

References 

2020 NASCAR Xfinity Series
Henry 180
2020 in sports in Wisconsin
NASCAR races at Road America